Octoknemaceae  is a monotypic family of flowering plants endemic to continental Africa. The APG III system of 2009 and the APG II system of 2003 (unchanged from the APG system of 1998), do not recognize this family. The family is recognized by the Angiosperm Phylogeny Website, based on work since the publication of the APG III system.

References

External links
 Octoknemaceae in L. Watson and M.J. Dallwitz (1992 onwards), The families of flowering plants
Parasitic Plant Connection: Octoknemaceae

Santalales
Eudicot families
Historically recognized angiosperm families
Monogeneric plant families